{{Infobox sportsperson
| name = Marilyn Okoro
| image = Marilyn_Okoro_Hengelo_2009.jpg
| imagesize = 250px
| caption = Okoro at the 2009 FBK Games
| country =  Great Britain
| club = Shaftesbury Barnet Harriers
| birth_date = 
| birth_place = London, England
| height = 
| weight =
| pb = 800 m 1:58.45
| olympics = 
| worlds =
| highestranking =  ''800 m: 7 (2008)
|Turned pro = 2006
|Retired = Jan 2021
| updated = 11 October 2008
| medaltemplates =

}}Marilyn Chinwenwa Okoro''' (born 23 September 1984, in London) is a British track and field athlete. She finished third in the 800 metres at both the 2007 and 2008 IAAF World Athletics Final. She was on the bronze winning 4 × 400 m relay at the 2007 World Championships in Athletics. She represented Great Britain at the Beijing Olympic Games in 2008 and finished sixth (1:59.53 mins) in the semi-finals. She was part of the 4 × 400 m relay team which finished fifth in the final of the 2008 Summer Olympics although the team was later upgraded to bronze medal position following disqualification for doping offences of the teams finishing in third and fourth place.

She attended Stowe School, Buckinghamshire, and on 26 June 2007 graduated from the University of Bath with a B.A. degree in Politics and French, then starting her first season as a full-time athlete. She speaks four languages (English, French, Spanish and Igbo) and sings in the jazz band The Felonius Monks.

Marilyn suffered an injury plagued 2009 outdoor season, though she battled through the pain barrier to finish a very credible 8th in the World Championships 800 m final in Berlin. Okoro was also included in the squad for the 4 × 400 m, but was not selected in the line-up to run in the final.

Marilyn had a limited race schedule in 2010, but returned to a degree of form when taking bronze at the UK championships. Subsequently, Okoro was selected to challenge for a medal in the 800 m alongside Jenny Meadows and Jemma Simpson at the 2010 European Championships in Barcelona. She finished 4th in her semi-final, therefore did not progress to the final. Okoro recovered from that disappointment to run the second leg in the 4 × 400 bronze medal winning quartet alongside Nicola Sanders, Lee McConnell and Perri Shakes-Drayton, clocking 52.0 seconds for her leg. She also ran in the heat running 51.8 seconds. Vicki Barr replaced Shakes-Drayton in the heats.

Okoro has been criticised heavily for her front running tactics, most notably by UK Athletics head coach Charles Van Commenee, who described Okoro's performance in the 800 m at the 2009 European Athletics Indoor Championships as "naive and unprofessional" despite not ever coaching the 800m. Following her non-selection for the 800 m event at the 2012 Summer Olympics, Okoro accused Van Commenee of being "a bit of a bully."

Marilyn changed coaches during 2013, moving to the USA and was coached by Johnny Gray Olympic Bronze Medalist and the then American Record Holder.  Her training partners included Team USA's Maggey Vessey and US #2 Duane Soloman. She represented Team England at the 2014 Commonwealth Games in Glasgow, where she ran in the semi-final of the 800m.

References

External links
 
 
 June 2014 interview with Marilyn from her USA training base
 
 

1984 births
Living people
Athletes from London
British female middle-distance runners
English female middle-distance runners
Olympic female middle-distance runners
Olympic athletes of Great Britain
Athletes (track and field) at the 2008 Summer Olympics
Commonwealth Games competitors for England
Athletes (track and field) at the 2006 Commonwealth Games
Athletes (track and field) at the 2014 Commonwealth Games
Universiade medalists in athletics (track and field)
Universiade bronze medalists for Great Britain
Medalists at the 2005 Summer Universiade
World Athletics Championships athletes for Great Britain
World Athletics Championships medalists
European Athletics Championships medalists
British Athletics Championships winners
Alumni of the University of Bath
People educated at Abbot's Hill School
People educated at Stowe School
English people of Nigerian descent
Black British sportswomen
Team Bath track and field athletes